Al Shohada may refer to:

Al Shohada Hotel, Mecca, Saudi Arabia
Al Shohada Mosque (Sana'a), Yemen
Al Shohada Mosque (Shiraz), Iran